The women's long jump event at the 1969 European Indoor Games was held on 8 March in Belgrade.

Results

References

Long jump at the European Athletics Indoor Championships
Long